Padukone is a coastal village in Byndoor Taluk, Udupi District. It is also a surname from coastal Karnataka in India. Padukone Village surrounded by the Souparnika River. It  is near famous Maravanthe. A portion of Nada Grama and Hadavu Grama is under Padukone Village. In 2016 a bridge was constructed between Maravanthe and Padukone over the Souparnika River. Part of the village is surrounded by the Souparnika River and one has to cross this river in an old wooden boat from Maraswami. Padukone is surrounded by coconut trees, water, and kudru.

Notable people with that surname have included:

 Deepika Padukone, Indian actress, daughter of Prakash
 Prakash Padukone, Indian badminton player, father of Deepika
 Sanchita Padukone, Indian actress
 Guru Dutt, original name: Vasant Kumar Shivshankar Padukone, Indian film director and actor. 

Padukone generally refers to mixed caste. Previously a brahmin man married a gurjar girl from raekwaal gotra which gives birth to a padukone child. It started since then but first in the 11th century in Rajasthan.

References

Indian surnames
Karnataka society

Byndoor
Byndoor Taluk
Udupi
Karnataka